Rob Geus (born 15 July 1971 in Rotterdam) is a Dutch cook and TV presenter.

Career 
Geus started the TV show  on SBS 6 in 2002 with Maureen Du Toit. In this show, Geus visits restaurants and student residences to check their kitchens for hygiene and safety. When Geus is convinced that the restaurant meets the hygiene and safety standards, he awards said restaurant with a Smaakpolitie OK-sticker. If the hygiene is sub par, Geus hands over a T-shirt with his catchphrase "Hier word ik niet vrolijk van" [This does not make me happy], a one liner Geus used since the first season. In 2006, Geus recorded a single with this title, in cooperation with Gebroeders Ko. The programme De Smaakpolitie attracted an average of almost a million viewers per episode in 2007. 

In 2008, Geus appeared in TV commercials promoting Stichting Promotie Kalfsvlees, an organisation promoting the use of veal. The commercials were pulled off the air after complaints from viewers, animal rights groups, and the Dutch government, which accused the organisation of painting an overly optimistic view on the welfare of calves used for veal production. In 2015, the TV show  criticized Geus for his so called "quality mark" which according to Rambam is a commercial logo and not a recognised quality mark.

Besides De Smaakpolitie, Geus presented the TV show  with Alberto Stegeman. In this show Geus and Stegeman tried to solve issues of Dutch people on their holiday destinations. He was also a contender on the shows Ranking the Stars (BNN/RTL 5, Sterren Dansen Op Het IJs and Stelletje Pottenbakkers! (both SBS6)

Geus opened his own pancake restaurant on 4 September 2010, but sold it after two years. In October 2017, he opened a new restaurant in Barendrecht.

After 18 years, Geus' contract with SBS6 was not renewed, after which he started working for RTV Rijnmond, a Dutch regional broadcasting company. In 2019, Geus was one of the contestants in the 20th season of the Dutch reality show Expeditie Robinson (RTL 4), he ended in 16th place. In the same year, he participated in The Roast of Ali B on Comedy Central. Geus returned in the 21th season of Expeditie Robinson in 2021 as one of eight former contenders. This time, he ended in 12th place. He also ended in 19th place in the TV show De Alleskunner VIPS.

Personal life
Geus lives in Barendrecht with his wife Suzanne, and has a daughter and a son. Besides his TV work, Geus released XG2, which is his own brand of cleaning products. He also plays football in a "star team" for Foundation KiKa (a Dutch charity foundation for the research of childhood cancer) and the Make-A-Wish Foundation.

Filmography 
{| class="wikitable"
! colspan="5" | Television
|-
! Year !! Production !! Channel !! Number of episodes !! Start 
|-
| 2002 - 2017 ||  || SBS6 || 134 || 27 February 2002  
|-
| 2007 || Sterren Dansen Op Het IJs || SBS6 || 1 || 11 January 2007  
|-
| 2008, 2019, 2021 ||  || BNN / RTL 5 || 36 || 7 November 2008, 4 September 2019, 27 October 2021
|-
| 2008 - 2016  ||  || SBS6 || 68 || 31 August 2008
|-
| 2013 || Drekwerk || SBS6 || 8 || 30 March 2013  
|-
| 2016 ||  || SBS6 || 4 || 22 May 2016  
|-
| 2018 ||  || SBS6 || 5 || 4 March 2018
|-
| 2019 || Expeditie Robinson 2019 || RTL4|| 16 || 1 September 2019
|-
| 2019 || Comedy Central Roast || Comedy Central || 4 || 17 December 2019
|-
| 2021 || || SBS6 || 28 || 20 August 2021
|-
| 2021 || Expeditie Robinson 2021 || RTL 4 || 33 || 29 August 2021
|}

PublicationsKook OK, 2005, Hier word ik vrolijk van, 2011, Trichis Publishing, De echte Geus, 2021'', Uitgeverij De Leeuw B.V,

References

External links

Website of Rob Geus

Living people
1971 births
Mass media people from Rotterdam
Dutch television presenters